Laura Tesoro (born 19 August 1996) is a Belgian singer and actress. She represented Belgium in the Eurovision Song Contest 2016 with the song "What's the Pressure".  Tesoro is also known for portraying Charlotte on the Flemish soap opera Familie, and placing second on season three of The Voice van Vlaanderen. The singer is also one of the four coaches on The Voice Kids.

Biography

1996–2014: Early life and career beginnings
Tesoro was born on 19 August 1996 in Antwerp to an Italian father and a Belgian mother. She had her first acting role in the Flemish crime drama Witse as Evy Cuypers in 2008, and went on to perform in musicals such as Annie and Domino. She performed at Ketnetpop in 2009. From 2012 to 2014, she appeared as Charlotte in Familie, a love interest to Guido. In 2014 she appeared in season three of The Voice van Vlaanderen, where she ended up as the runner-up. Throughout her time on the show, she was a member of Team Koen. She released her debut single "Outta Here" the same year, which peaked at number 23 on the Belgian Flemish Singles Chart.

2015–present: Eurovision Song Contest

In 2015, she released her second single "Funky Love". In November 2015, Tesoro was announced as one of the five participants of Eurosong 2016. In the first show, she covered the song "Düm Tek Tek" by Hadise, which represented Turkey in the Eurovision Song Contest 2009. In the second show she revealed her Eurovision candidate song "What's the Pressure", and received the highest televoting score. In the final on 17 January 2016, she was declared the winner after placing first with both the Belgian public and international juries. She represented Belgium in the Eurovision Song Contest 2016 in Stockholm, where she placed tenth in the final. In the same year, Tesoro took part in the Flemish version of Poppy in DreamWorks' Trolls. On 28 April 2017, she released the single "Higher", the song peaked at number 20 on the Flemish Singles Chart. Furthermore, on 27 October 2017, she released the single "Beast" which was available for pre-save on Spotify on 20 October, seven days prior.
She is also a well-accomplished boxer, and her single "Beast" has a music video showing her boxing skills. 

In late 2019, Tesoro released the single "Limits". The song served as the lead single to her debut album. A few weeks later she added "Press Pause" as the second single, after releasing her debut album on 24 October 2019.

Discography

Album

Singles

Awards and nominations

Filmography

Notes

References

External links
lauratesoro on Instagram. Archived from the original.

Living people
1996 births
Belgian women pop singers
Eurovision Song Contest entrants for Belgium
Eurovision Song Contest entrants of 2016
Belgian people of Italian descent
English-language singers from Belgium
Flemish stage actresses
Belgian child actresses
Flemish television actresses
21st-century Flemish actresses
The Voice (franchise) contestants
Flemish musicians
21st-century Belgian singers
21st-century Belgian women singers